Anderson Brothers Building, also known as Anderson Brothers Book Store, is a historic commercial building located at Charlottesville, Virginia. The original section was built in 1848, and expanded to its present size in 1890–1891.  It is a three-story, seven bay Late Victorian style building.  It is constructed of brick and has a metal clad facade.

It was listed on the National Register of Historic Places in 1982.  It is located in the Rugby Road-University Corner Historic District.

References

Commercial buildings on the National Register of Historic Places in Virginia
Commercial buildings completed in 1848
Victorian architecture in Virginia
Buildings and structures in Charlottesville, Virginia
National Register of Historic Places in Charlottesville, Virginia
Individually listed contributing properties to historic districts on the National Register in Virginia